The following is a list of state highways in the U.S. state of Louisiana designated in the 850–899 range.


Louisiana Highway 850

Louisiana Highway 850 (LA 850) runs  in a north–south direction from LA 849 south of Grayson to LA 4 north of Grayson.

The entire route is set to be deleted and transferred to local control as part of Louisiana DOTD's "right-sizing" program.

Louisiana Highway 851

Louisiana Highway 851 (LA 851) runs  in a general northwest to southeast direction from LA 126 to LA 849 southeast of Grayson.

The entire route is set to be deleted and transferred to local control under Louisiana DOTD's "right-sizing" program.

Louisiana Highway 852

Louisiana Highway 852 (LA 852) runs  in a southwest to northeast direction from US 80 in Rayville to LA 583 northeast of Rayville.

Louisiana Highway 853

Louisiana Highway 853 (LA 853) ran  in a general southwest to northeast direction from a local road southwest of Rayville to a second local road in Rayville.

Louisiana Highway 854

Louisiana Highway 854 (LA 854) runs  in an east–west direction from LA 183 north of Holly Ridge to LA 17 north of Delhi.

Louisiana Highway 855

Louisiana Highway 855 (LA 855) runs  in an east–west direction from the junction of two local roads to a junction with LA 17 north of Delhi.

Louisiana Highway 856

Louisiana Highway 856 (LA 856) runs  in an east–west direction from the concurrent US 425/LA 15 north of Mangham to a local road northeast of Mangham.

Louisiana Highway 857

Louisiana Highway 857 (LA 857) runs  in a north–south direction from the concurrent US 425/LA 15 in Baskin to LA 132 northeast of Baskin.

Louisiana Highway 858

Louisiana Highway 858 (LA 858) runs  in an east–west direction from a local road to a junction with LA 17 north of Crowville.

Louisiana Highway 859

Louisiana Highway 859 (LA 859) runs  in a north–south direction from LA 858 to LA 132 north of Crowville.

Louisiana Highway 860

Louisiana Highway 860 (LA 860) runs  in an east–west direction from the junction of two local roads north of Crowville, Franklin Parish to a junction with LA 577 at Warsaw Ferry, Madison Parish.

Louisiana Highway 861

Louisiana Highway 861 (LA 861) runs  in an east–west direction from LA 17 to a dead end northeast of Crowville.

Louisiana Highway 862

Louisiana Highway 862 (LA 862) runs  in a general northwest to southeast direction from LA 610 to a local road east of Swampers.

Louisiana Highway 863

Louisiana Highway 863 (LA 863) runs  in an east–west direction from LA 4 to LA 578 east of Winnsboro.

Louisiana Highway 864

Louisiana Highway 864 (LA 864) runs  in a north–south direction along Loop Road from the concurrent US 425/LA 15 to the concurrent LA 4/LA 17 in Winnsboro.

Louisiana Highway 865

Louisiana Highway 865 (LA 865) consists of two disconnected road segments totaling  within Franklin Parish.  The southern segment extends from LA 4 south of Winnsboro to the concurrent US 425/LA 15 in Winnsboro.  The northern segment extends from the concurrent LA 4/LA 17 in Winnsboro to the junction of two local roads north of Winnsboro.

Louisiana Highway 866

Louisiana Highway 866 (LA 866) runs  in an east–west direction from LA 3210 to a local road south of Winnsboro.

Louisiana Highway 867

Louisiana Highway 867 (LA 867) runs  in a general east–west direction from the concurrent US 425/LA 15 south of Baskin to LA 577 east of Baskin.

Louisiana Highway 868

Louisiana Highway 868 (LA 868) runs  in a north–south direction from the concurrent US 425/LA 15 in Winnsboro to LA 867 southeast of Baskin.  The route's mileposts increase from the northern end contrary to common practice.

Louisiana Highway 869

Louisiana Highway 869 (LA 869) runs  in an east–west direction, forming a loop off of LA 618 northwest of Winnsboro.

Louisiana Highway 870

Louisiana Highway 870 (LA 870) runs  in a north–south direction from LA 135 to a local road west of Winnsboro.

Louisiana Highway 871

Louisiana Highway 871 (LA 871) runs  in a north–south direction from a local road southeast of Fort Necessity to a junction with LA 562 at Fort Necessity.

Louisiana Highway 872

Louisiana Highway 872 (LA 872) ran  in a north–south direction from the junction of two local roads to a junction with LA 871 southwest of Fort Necessity.

Louisiana Highway 873

Louisiana Highway 873 (LA 873) runs  in an east–west direction from the junction of two local roads west of Extension to LA 562 at Extension.  The route's mileposts increase from the eastern end contrary to common practice.

Louisiana Highway 874

Louisiana Highway 874 (LA 874) runs  in a north–south direction from the junction of two local roads south of Jigger to LA 128 at Jigger.  The route's mileposts increase from the northern end contrary to common practice.

Louisiana Highway 875

Louisiana Highway 875 (LA 875) runs  in a loop from LA 562 southwest of Wisner to the concurrent US 425/LA 15 north of Wisner.

Louisiana Highway 876

Louisiana Highway 876 (LA 876) runs  in a north–south direction from LA 875 west of Wisner to LA 128 west of Gilbert.

Louisiana Highway 877

Louisiana Highway 877 (LA 877) runs  in a southwest to northeast direction from LA 17 south of Epps, West Carroll Parish to LA 134 southwest of Lake Providence, East Carroll Parish.

Louisiana Highway 878

Louisiana Highway 878 (LA 878) runs  in a north–south direction from LA 2 to the junction of LA 585 and LA 587 west of Oak Grove.

Louisiana Highway 879

Louisiana Highway 879 (LA 879) runs  in an east–west direction from LA 585 at Fiske to LA 2 in Oak Grove.  The route's mileposts increase from the eastern end contrary to common practice.

Louisiana Highway 880

Louisiana Highway 880 (LA 880) runs  in a southwest to northeast direction from LA 17 south of Kilbourne to LA 585 east of Kilbourne.

Louisiana Highway 881

Louisiana Highway 881 (LA 881) runs  in an east–west direction from LA 134 to LA 581 west of Transylvania.

Louisiana Highway 882

Louisiana Highway 882 (LA 882) runs  in a general north–south direction, forming a loop off of LA 134 southwest of Lake Providence.  The route's mileposts increase from the northern end contrary to common practice. As of 2019, the route is under agreement to be removed from the state highway system and transferred to local control.

Louisiana Highway 883

Louisiana Highway 883 (LA 883) consists of two road segments with a total length of  that are located in the East Carroll Parish town of Lake Providence.

LA 883-1 runs  along 4th Street from LA 134 (Tensas Bayou Road) to US 65 (one-way pair of Scarborough and Sparrow Streets).
LA 883-2 runs  along Charles D. Jones Boulevard (formerly Gould Boulevard) from LA 883-1 (4th Street) to US 65 (Lake Street).

Louisiana Highway 884

Louisiana Highway 884 (LA 884) ran  in a southwest to northeast direction from a dead end at the Tensas River to a junction with US 65 south of Tallulah.

Louisiana Highway 885

Louisiana Highway 885 (LA 885) ran  in an east–west direction from LA 603 east of Afton, Madison Parish to a dead end alongside Bayou Vidal in Tensas Parish.

Louisiana Highway 886

Louisiana Highway 886 (LA 886) ran  in an east–west direction from LA 605 north of Newellton to LA 608 northeast of Newellton.

Louisiana Highway 887

Louisiana Highway 887 (LA 887) runs  in an east–west direction, primarily along Hillcrest Drive, from LA 605 in Newellton to LA 608 east of Newellton.

Louisiana Highway 888

Louisiana Highway 888 (LA 888) runs  in a general east–west direction from LA 4 west of Newellton to LA 605 north of Newellton.

The route initially heads northward from LA 4, roughly following the east bank of the Tensas River.  Upon reaching a point known as Tensas Bluff, LA 888 turns eastward, makes a long curves to the north, then curves eastward again along the river.  East of Westwood, LA 888 begins a brief concurrency with LA 575.  The highway then makes a turn to the southeast while LA 575 continues due east.   later, it intersects US 65.  LA 888 proceeds a short distance to its end at LA 605 on Lake St. Joseph at Balmoral.  It is an undivided two-lane highway for its entire length.

Louisiana Highway 889

Louisiana Highway 889 (LA 889) ran  in an east–west direction from a local road to a junction with LA 4 west of Newellton.

Louisiana Highway 890

Louisiana Highway 890 (LA 890) ran  in a north–south direction from a local road southwest of Newellton to a junction with LA 4 west of Newellton.

Louisiana Highway 891

Louisiana Highway 891 (LA 891) ran  in an east–west direction from a local road west of Crimea to a junction with LA 128 at Crimea.

Louisiana Highway 892

Louisiana Highway 892 (LA 892) runs  in a northwest to southeast direction from LA 573 to LA 568 west of St. Joseph.

Louisiana Highway 893

Louisiana Highway 893 (LA 893) ran  in an east–west direction from a dead end at the Tensas River to a junction with LA 573 at Cooter Point.

Louisiana Highway 894

Louisiana Highway 894 (LA 894) ran  in a southeast to northwest direction from LA 571 to a local road northwest of Waterproof.

Louisiana Highway 895

Louisiana Highway 895 (LA 895) ran  in a southwest to northeast direction from US 65 (now LA 568) north of Waterproof to a dead end alongside the Mississippi River levee.

Louisiana Highway 896

Louisiana Highway 896 (LA 896) runs  in a general north–south direction from US 65 to LA 568 north of Waterproof.  The route's mileposts increase from the northern end contrary to common practice.

Louisiana Highway 897

Louisiana Highway 897 (LA 897) consists of six road segments with a total length of  that are located in the Tensas Parish town of St. Joseph.

LA 897-1 runs  along Levee Road from a point south of the corporate limits, continuing onto Front Street within the town, and turning onto Plank Road to the junction of LA 128 and LA 605 at Newton Road.
LA 897-2 runs  along 4th Street from the junction of LA 897-3 and LA 897-6 at Hancock Street to LA 128 (Plank Road).
LA 897-3 runs  along Hancock Street from the junction of LA 897-2 and LA 897-6 at 4th Street to LA 897-1 (Front Street).
LA 897-4 runs  along Washington Street from LA 897-5 (2nd Street) to LA 897-1 (Front Street).
LA 897-5 runs  along 2nd Street from LA 897-4 (Washington Street) to LA 897-3 (Hancock Street).
LA 897-6 runs  along 12th, Beech, 7th, and Hancock Streets from LA 128 (Plank Road) to the junction of LA 897-2 and LA 897-3 at 4th Street.

Louisiana Highway 898

Louisiana Highway 898 (LA 898) runs  in a north–south direction, forming a loop off of US 65 at Somerset.

Louisiana Highway 899

Louisiana Highway 899 (LA 899) ran  in an east–west direction from LA 566 to US 65 north of Clayton.

See also

References

External links
Maps / GIS Data Homepage, Louisiana Department of Transportation and Development